The 2015–16 Richmond Spiders women's basketball team will represent the University of Richmond during the 2015–16 college basketball season. The Spiders, led by eleventh year head coach Michael Shafer. The Spiders are members of the Atlantic 10 Conference and play their home games at the Robins Center. They finished the season 13–18, 5–11 in A-10 to finish a 4 way tie for tenth place. They advanced to the second round of the A-10 women's tournament where they lost to VCU.

2015–16 media
All Spiders games are broadcast on WTVR 6.3 with Robert Fish on the call. The games are also streamed on Spider TV .

Roster

Schedule

|-
!colspan=9 style="background:#000066; color:#FFFFFF;"| Non-conference regular season

|-
!colspan=9 style="background:#000066; color:#FFFFFF;"| Atlantic 10 regular Season

|-
!colspan=9 style="background:#000066; color:#990000;"| Atlantic 10 Tournament

Rankings
2015–16 NCAA Division I women's basketball rankings

See also
 2015–16 Richmond Spiders men's basketball team

References

Richmond Spiders women's basketball seasons
Richmond
Richmond Spiders women's basketball
Richmond
Spiders basketball, women
Spiders basketball, women